George Reinke (December 27, 1914 – September 22, 2009) was the first elected County Executive of Dane County, Wisconsin, United States.

Born in the town of Middleton, Wisconsin, Reinke served in the Dane County government as an accountant, county clerk, and county administrator. He served as County Executive of Dane County from 1973 to 1981. He died in Madison, Wisconsin.

Notes

1914 births
2009 deaths
Dane County Executives
People from Middleton, Wisconsin
20th-century American politicians